Oleylamine is an organic compound with a molecular formula C18H35NH2. It is an unsaturated fatty amine related to the fatty acid oleic acid. The pure compound is a clear and colorless liquid. Commercially available oleylamine reagents vary in color from clear and colorless to varying degrees of yellow due to impurities. The major impurities include trans isomer (elaidylamine) and other long chain amines with varying chain lengths. Minor impurities include oxygen-containing substances such as amides and nitroalkanes.

Chemical reactions
Oleylamine reacts with carboxylic acid to form its carboxylate salt through an exothermic reaction. Its carboxylate salt can further condensate into amides through the loss of one water molecule. In the presence of  acetic acid, oleylamin formes with DNA insoluble complexes with the radii of the particles equil 60–65 nm.

Uses
Commercially, it is mainly used as a surfactant or precursor to surfactants.

It has also been used in the laboratory in the synthesis of nanoparticles. It can function both as a solvent for the reaction mixture and as a coordinating agent to stabilize the surface of the particles. It can also coordinate with metal ions, change the form of metal precursor and affect the formation kinetics of nanoparticles during the synthesis.

Safety
Oleylamine has an LD50 (Intraperitoneal) of 888 mg/kg in mice, however note that it is listed as a level 3 health hazard on the NFPA diamond, so it should be handled with caution.

Characterization
Oleylamine can be characterized using MS, HNMR, CNMR, IR, and Raman. Each technique shows distinct peaks in various regions.

See also 
 Oleamide

References 

Amines
Alkene derivatives